Leonardo de' Medici was a Roman Catholic prelate who served as Bishop of Forlì (1519–1526).

Biography
On 14 Mar 1519, Leonardo de' Medici was appointed during the papacy of Pope Leo X as Bishop of Forlì.
He served as Bishop of Forlì until his resignation in 1526.

References

External links 
 (for Chronology of Bishops) 
 (for Chronology of Bishops)  

16th-century Italian Roman Catholic bishops
Bishops appointed by Pope Leo X
Bishops of Forlì